Rick Riordan is an author of children's fantasy literature. Each of his works of children's literature centers around an adaptation of mythology for modern readers and for children. He has used Greek, Roman, Egyptian, and Norse and combinations thereof in a total of five separate novel series.

The mythology used in his works possesses elements unique to his series, but has a largely historical basis. Some of its characteristics include an emphasis on human-divine interaction and a preference for anglicized names.

Rick Riordan's fictional universe
 Greco-Roman mythology: Camp Half-Blood Chronicles
 Percy Jackson & the Olympians
 The Heroes of Olympus
 The Trials of Apollo
 Egyptian mythology: The Kane Chronicles
 Norse mythology: Magnus Chase and the Gods of Asgard

Riordan's sources
Riordan's sources for the mythology used in his books must largely be surmised from isolated comments on the subject during various interviews, as he has never released a list of any kind. These sources begin with the myths and the derivations thereof that he was exposed to as a child. Unnamed "novels on Norse mythology", suggested to him by a teacher who noticed his interest in The Lord of the Rings, were his first introduction to mythology and continue to influence his writing today. The author also claims to have read such notable classics as The Iliad and The Odyssey, and to use his "general knowledge" of a given mythology as a basis for his stories. As far as Greek mythology is concerned, Riordan has stated that Tales of the Greek Heroes by Roger Lancelyn Green—called by its author a "retelling of the Greek myths... based on multitudinous sources"—was one of his first introductions to that type of myth, and is in part responsible for his decision to interpret myths in his own books. Finally, Riordan has stated that he uses modern sources such as The Theoi Project for fact-checking purposes, as needed.

None of his novels include a list of references. Percy Jackson's Greek Gods and Percy Jackson's Greek Heroes alone possess "Background Reading" sections, listing novels such as Robert Fagles's translation of The Aeneid and web sites such as the Encyclopedia Mythica.

References

External links
Official Rick Riordan site

Rick Riordan
Mythology in popular culture
Classical mythology in popular culture
Egyptian mythology in popular culture
Norse mythology in popular culture
Mythopoeia
Fictional universes